Claudin-19 is a protein that in humans is encoded by the CLDN19 gene. It belongs to the group of claudins. Claudin-19 has been implicated in magnesium transport.

Claudins, such as CLDN19, are transmembrane proteins found at tight junctions. Tight junctions form barriers that control the passage of ions and molecules across an epithelial sheet and the movement of proteins and lipids between apical and basolateral domains of epithelial cells (Lee et al., 2006).[supplied by OMIM]

References

External links

Further reading